Frank Vollertsen (born 13 August 1958) is a German scientist and the director of the "Bremer Institut für angewandte Strahltechnik" (BIAS).

He is the recipient of the Gottfried Wilhelm Leibniz Prize, awarded by the Deutsche Forschungsgemeinschaft (German Research Foundation) in 2002.

References

External links 
 Frank Vollertsen on the Deutsche Forschungsgemeinschaft
 Bremer Institut für angewandte Strahltechnik

1958 births
Living people
Scientists from Bremen